Lam Sali is a four-way intersection in Hua Mak subdistrict, Bang Kapi district, Bangkok. It is also the name of the surrounding area.

It is an intersection of Ramkhamhaeng and Srinagarindra roads, not far from The Mall Bang Kapi.

Its name is distorted from the word "Lam Ta Samli" (ลำตาสำลี; lit: the old Samli's track, or Mr. Samli's track). Since in the olden days, this area was a countryside that was full of waterways, such as Khlong Saen Saep canal and rice fields with grove woods, known as "Thung Bang Kapi" (ทุ่งบางกะปิ; Bang Kapi Field), and was a Muslim settlement. There was an old man named "To Kili" (โต๊ะกีลี) or "Ta Samli" (ตาสำลี) whose job was to raise buffalos for the locals. He often drove a herd of buffalo to eat grass at front of the Yamee-Unmuttageen Mosque in present day. Long days, the fields were so smooth that it became a path, hence the name Lam Ta Samli and finally became a Lam Sali.

Lam Sali is regarded as one of the most traffic jams in Bangkok and since December 7, 2018, the Lam Sali overpass (only inbound side) has been closed for one year. Due to the construction of the MRT Orange Line.

References

Bang Kapi district
Neighbourhoods of Bangkok
Road junctions in Bangkok